Petronella Theodora Maria "Ellen" Bontje (born 11 June 1958 in Hilversum, North Holland) is an equestrian from The Netherlands, who won the silver medal in the Team Dressage Event at the 2000 Olympic Games in Sydney, Australia. She did so alongside Anky van Grunsven, Coby van Baalen, and Arjen Teeuwissen. In the individual competition Bontje finished in sixth position.

Eight years earlier, at the 1992 Olympic Games in Barcelona, Spain, Bontje was also a member of the Dutch team that won the silver medal in the Team Dressage Competition. She competed in three Summer Games for her native country, starting at the 1988 Olympics in Seoul, South Korea.

She has won eight silver medals and one bronze medal in team dressage at various championships.

References

External links
 Dutch Olympic Committee
 

1958 births
Living people
Dutch female equestrians
Dutch dressage riders
Sportspeople from Hilversum
Equestrians at the 1988 Summer Olympics
Equestrians at the 1992 Summer Olympics
Equestrians at the 2000 Summer Olympics
Medalists at the 1992 Summer Olympics
Medalists at the 2000 Summer Olympics
Olympic equestrians of the Netherlands
Olympic silver medalists for the Netherlands
Olympic medalists in equestrian
20th-century Dutch women